Mary & Tim is a 1996 American romantic drama television film directed by Glenn Jordan and written by Ann Beckett. It is a remake of the 1979 Australian film Tim, which was based on the 1974 novel by Colleen McCullough. Mary Horton (Candice Bergen), a 50-something year old widow, begins a romance with Tim Melville (Thomas McCarthy), a mentally disabled gardener 30 years her junior. The film aired on CBS on November 3, 1996.

Cast
Candice Bergen as Mary Horton
Richard Kiley as Ron Melville 
Tom McCarthy as Tim Melville
Louise Latham as Forbsie
Kelli Williams as Justine Melville

References

External links

Mary & Tim at TCMDB

1996 television films
1996 romantic drama films
1996 films
1990s American films
1990s English-language films
American drama television films
American romantic drama films
CBS network films
Films about intellectual disability
Films based on adaptations
Films based on Australian novels
Films based on romance novels
Films directed by Glenn Jordan
Films scored by Michel Colombier
Remakes of Australian films
Romance film remakes
Romance television films
Sonar Entertainment films
Television films based on books
Television remakes of films